Gertrud Seidmann,  (16 September 1919 – 15 February 2013) was an Austrian-British linguist and jewellery historian, specialising in engraved gems.

Her first career was as a linguist, teaching German and applied linguistics at Battersea County School, the University of Oxford, and the University of Southampton: she was awarded the Goethe Medal in 1968. She formally retired in 1979 and dedicated herself to researching jewellery and engraved gems, becoming a research associate of the Institute of Archaeology and of Oxford's Beazley Archive.

In 2004, Seidmann matriculated into Wolfson College, Oxford to study for a Master of Letters (MLitt) research degree. She thereby became the University of Oxford's oldest ever student. She went on to undertake research towards a doctorate in the School of Archaeology. In 2011, due to ill health and at the age of 91, she ended her studies and was awarded a Certificate of Graduate Attainment by the university.

Honours
In 1985, Seidmann was elected a Fellow of the Royal Society of Arts (FRSA). She was elected a Fellow of the Society of Antiquaries of London (FSA) in 1986.

In 1999, a Festschrift was published in her honour: it was titled Classicism to Neo-classicism: Essays dedicated to Gertrud Seidmann, and was edited by Martin Henig and Dimitris Plantzos.

Selected works

References

1919 births
2013 deaths
Linguists from Austria
Linguists from the United Kingdom
Austrian art historians
British art historians
Women linguists
Women art historians
Fellows of the Society of Antiquaries of London
Alumni of Wolfson College, Oxford
20th-century Austrian women
21st-century Austrian women
20th-century British women
21st-century British women
Australian emigrants to the United Kingdom
British women historians